The Liberia women's national football team represents Liberia in international women's football. It is governed by the Liberia Football Association. It has played in five FIFA recognized matches.

History

Background and development

Early development of the women's game at the time colonial powers brought football to the continent was limited as colonial powers in the region tended to take make concepts of patriarchy and women's participation in sport with them to local cultures that had similar concepts already embedded in them. The lack of later development of the national team on a wider international level symptomatic of all African teams is a result of several factors, including  limited access to education, poverty amongst women in the wider society, and fundamental inequality present in the society that occasionally allows for female specific human rights abuses.  When quality female football players are developed, they tend to leave for greater opportunities abroad. Continent wide, funding is also an issue, with most development money coming from FIFA, not the national football association. Future, success for women's football in Africa is dependent on improved facilities and access by women to these facilities. Attempting to commercialize the game and make it commercially viable is not the solution, as demonstrated by the current existence of many youth and women's football camps held throughout the continent.

The national federation, Liberia Football Association, was founded in 1936.  It became a FIFA affiliate in 1962.  Women's football is represented on the committee by specific constitutional mandate.  In 2009, the organization did not have any full-time staff members specifically dedicated to assisting women's football.  Their kit includes red shirts, white shorts and red socks.

Football is the most popular women's participation sport in the country. A women's football program was first organized by the national federation in the country in 1988. In 2000, there were 264 registered female players in the country.   In 2006, there were 277 players.  In 2006, there were only two women's only teams available for women to play on while there were 43 teams for men to play on. By 2009, regional and national women's football competitions had been established, but no competition had been organized for UL or schools. Rights to broadcast the 2011 Women's World Cup in the country were bought by the African Union of Broadcasting.

Jamesetta Howard has served as the country's Minister of Youth and Sports.  The national football association president was Izetta Sombo Wesley.  The country's president was Ellen Johnson-Sirleaf.  All were women and all supported the women's national team. In 2007, Izetta Wesley was named a member of the FIFA Women's Football Committee and that of FIFA Women's World Cup, with her term starting in 2008.  She has also served as the Match Commissioner of CAF and FIFA, and Vice President of the West African Football Union (WAFU).

The team
In 1985, almost no country in the world had a women's national football team, including Liberia who did not play in their first FIFA recognized match until February 2007 though the team played three non-recognized games in 2006. National team matches have been played at Antoinette Tubman Stadium.

On 18 February 2007 in a game in Monrovia, Liberia lost to Ethiopia women's national football team 0–3 after having been down 0–1 at the half. On 10 March in a game in Addis Abeba, Liberia lost to Ethiopia 0–2 after being down 0–1 at the half. In 2010, the country did not have a team competing in the African Women's Championships. The country did not have a team competing at the 2011 All Africa Games. On 13 February 2011 in a game in Monrovia, Liberia lost to Ghana by a score of 0–4. On 27 February in a game in Accra, Liberia lost to Ghana 0–7.

Liberia's international ranking improved in the late 2000s before falling in the early 2010s: in 2007, it was ranked 144; in 2008, 117; in 2009, 92; in 2010, 128; in 2011, 136; and in 2012, 130, while holding 35th place in Africa.

Team image

Other national teams

U17 team
In 2006, there was no FIFA recognized youth national team.
They participated in the African Women U-17 Championship 2008. In the preliminary round, they were supposed to play Benin but Benin withdrew from the competition. In the first round, they were supposed to play Nigeria but they withdrew from the competition.

U19/U20 team
In 2006, there was no FIFA recognized  youth national team.
Between 2002–2010 in the FIFA Women U19/U20 World Cup, a U19 event up until 2006 when it became U20, the country participated in the qualifying tournament.

The country participated in the African Women U-20 Championship 2006. They were supposed to play Guinea in Round 1 but Guinea withdrew from the tournament. In Round 2, they played their first match in Algeria, where they won 3–2.  Algeria withdrew from the tournament before playing in the return match in Liberia. They met Nigeria in the quarterfinals, tying 1–1 in one match, before losing 1–9 in the second.

Homeless World Cup team
In 2008, a national team represented the country at the Homeless World Cup. In the opening round robin round where they finished second, they beat Cameroon 16–1, beat Colombia 8–5, lost to Zambia 1–4, beat Paraguay 4–1, beat Uganda 7–2, beat Kyrgyzstan 7–3, and beat Australia 14–3.  In the semi-final, they tied Colombia 1–1, and won 1–0 in penalty kicks.  They lost to Zambia 1–7 in the final.

Amputee football team
A woman's team from the country competed at the 2011 Cup of African Nations for Amputee Football.  In that year, they played Ghana in a friendly in Monrovia, Liberia in the lead up to the competition.

Results and fixtures

The following is a list of match results in the last 12 months, as well as any future matches that have been scheduled.

Their first draw was achieved in 2014.

2021

2022

Coaching staff

Current coaching staff

Manager history

Players

Current squad
 The following players were named on 10 October 2021 for the 2022 Africa Women Cup of Nations qualification tournament. 

 Caps and goals accurate up to and including 30 October 2021.

Recent call-ups
The following players have been called up to a Liberia  squad in the past 12 months.

Records

*Active players in bold, statistics correct as of 6 August 2021.

Most capped players

Top goalscorers

Competitive record

FIFA Women's World Cup

*Draws include knockout matches decided on penalty kicks.

Olympic Games

*Draws include knockout matches decided on penalty kicks.

Africa Women Cup of Nations

*Draws include knockout matches decided on penalty kicks.

African Games

WAFU Women's Cup record

Honors

References

External links
FIFA profile

Liberia national football team
African women's national association football teams
Women's sport in Liberia